The Lancashire and Yorkshire Railway (L&YR) was a major British railway company before the 1923 Grouping. It was incorporated in 1847 from an amalgamation of several existing railways. It was the third-largest railway system based in northern England (after the Midland and North Eastern Railways).

The intensity of its service was reflected in the 1,650 locomotives it owned – it was by far the most densely-trafficked system in the British Isles with more locomotives per mile than any other company – and that one third of its 738 signal boxes controlled junctions averaging one every . It was the first mainline railway to introduce electrification of some of its lines, and it also ran steamboat services across the Irish Sea and North Sea, being a bigger shipowner than any other British railway company.

It amalgamated with the London and North Western Railway on 1 January 1922. One year later, the merged company became the largest constituent of the London, Midland and Scottish Railway.

History
The L&YR was incorporated in 1847, being an amalgamation of several important lines, the chief of which was the Manchester and Leeds Railway (itself having been incorporated in 1836).

Constituent companies
The following companies, in order, were amalgamated into the L&YR.  The dates shown are, in most cases, the Acts of Parliament authorising the incorporation and amalgamation of each company.  In a few instances the effective date is used.
 Manchester and Leeds Railway, 4 July 1836 – 9 July 1847
 Manchester, Bolton and Bury Canal Navigation and Railway, 23 August 1831 – 18 July 1846
 Huddersfield and Sheffield Junction Railway, 30 June 1845 – 27 July 1846, now the Penistone Line.
 Liverpool and Bury Railway, 31 July 1845 – 27 July 1846
 Preston and Wyre Railway, Harbour and Dock Company, 1 July 1839 – 3 August 1846 (joint LNWR from 28 July 1849)
 Preston and Wyre Railway and Harbour Company, 3 July 1835 – 1 July 1839
 West Riding Union Railway, 18 August 1846 – 17 November 1846
 West Yorkshire Railway, 1845 – 18 August 1846
 Leeds and West Riding Junction Railway, ?  – 18 August 1846
 Ashton, Stalybridge and Liverpool Junction Railway, 19 July 1844 – 9 July 1847
 Wakefield, Pontefract and Goole Railway, 31 July 1845 – 9 July 1847
 Manchester and Southport Railway, 22 July 1847 – 3 July 1854 (joint ELR)
 Liverpool, Crosby and Southport Railway, 2 July 1847 – 14 June 1855
 Blackburn Railway, 24 July 1851 – 12 July 1858 (joint ELR)
 Bolton, Blackburn, Clitheroe and West Yorkshire Railway, 9 July 1847 – 24 July 1851
 Blackburn, Darwen and Bolton Railway, 30 June 1845 – 9 July 1847
 Blackburn, Clitheroe and North Western Junction Railway, 27 July 1846 – 9 July 1847
 Sheffield, Rotherham, Barnsley, Wakefield, Huddersfield and Goole Railway, 7 August 1846 – 2 August 1858 (acquired northern half of line)
 East Lancashire Railway, 21 July 1845 – 13 May 1859
 Manchester, Bury and Rossendale Railway, 4 July 1844 – 21 July 1845
 Blackburn, Burnley, Accrington and Colne Extension Railway, 30 June 1845 – 21 July 1845
 Blackburn and Preston Railway, 6 June 1844 – 3 August 1846
 Liverpool, Ormskirk and Preston Railway, 18 August 1846 – October 1846
 Fleetwood, Preston and West Riding Junction Railway, 27 July 1846 – 17 June 1866 (joint LNWR)
 Preston and Longridge Railway, 14 July 1836 – 23 June 1856
 Blackpool and Lytham Railway, 17 May 1861 – 29 June 1871 (joint LNWR)
 Lancashire Union Railway, 25 July 1864 – 16 July 1883 (joint LNWR)
 North Union Railway, 22 May 1834 – 26 July 1889 (joint LNWR)
 Wigan Branch Railway, 29 May 1830 – 22 May 1834
 Preston and Wigan Railway, 22 April 1831 – 22 May 1834
 Bolton and Preston Railway, 15 June 1837 – 10 May 1844
 Bury and Tottington District Railway, 2 August 1877 – 24 July 1888
 West Lancashire Railway, 14 August 1871 – 15 July 1897
 Liverpool, Southport and Preston Junction Railway, 7 August 1884 – 15 July 1897

The system
The system consisted of many branches and alternative routes, so that it is not easy to determine the location of its main line.  For working purposes the railway was split into three divisions:
  Western Division:
 Manchester to Blackpool and Fleetwood;
 Manchester to Bolton, Wigan, Southport and Liverpool; and the direct line to Liverpool;
 East Lancashire or Central Division
 Manchester to Oldham, Bury, Rochdale, Todmorden, Accrington, Burnley and Colne. It also included the connection to the LNWR at Stockport for through traffic to London.
 Eastern Division:
 Todmorden to Halifax, Bradford, Leeds, Huddersfield, Wakefield, Normanton, Goole, and Doncaster.
Whereas there were various lines split between the Central and Western Divisions there was only one route connecting the Eastern and Central Divisions. This line cut through the Pennines between Lancashire and Yorkshire using a number of long tunnels, the longest of which was Summit Tunnel ( in length) near Rochdale.

Manchester Victoria railway station

Manchester Victoria railway station was one of the largest railway stations in the country at the time. Lately the station capacity has been reduced to two platforms for Metrolink trams, two bay platforms, and four through platforms under  Manchester Arena, which now replaces a significant area once occupied by the station. The main façade and station building of the original Hunts Bank station still exist and are kept in relatively good condition.

Electrification

The L&YR was the first in the country to electrify a mainline route. In Liverpool, the fourth rail system pioneered by the tube railways in London was used at 600 V DC, although this was later converted to a third rail system.
 Liverpool Exchange –  and : 22 March 1904
 Liverpool –  (two routes): July and December 1906
 Southport – : 1909
 Aintree – : 1913

In 1912 Dick, Kerr & Co.'s Preston factory was considering tendering for a Brazilian contract, and approached the L&YR to use the Bury to Holcombe Brook Line for test purposes at Dick, Kerr's expense. After prolonged trials the trains entered public use on 29 July 1913. The L&YR purchased the equipment and stock on the successful completion of the trials in 1916.

In 1913 a decision was taken to electrify the Manchester to Bury route at 1.2 kV DC in an attempt to overcome competition from electric trams.  Using the third rail system, trains powered by electric motor cars (or carriages) began running on 17 April 1916 but as Horwich was by then involved in war work, deliveries of the new electric stock were delayed and it was not until August 1916 that steam trains were withdrawn from the route.  In 1920 the L&YR also considered electrifying the Manchester–Oldham–Shaw and Royton lines, but no work was carried out.  During 1917 work began to convert the Bury to Holcombe Brook line to a third rail system, matching the Manchester to Bury system.  Third-rail trains started to run on 29 March 1918.

Livery

Locomotives of the Lancashire and Yorkshire Railway were originally painted dark green with ornate brasswork and copper-capped chimneys.  Lining was black and white. In 1876 the dark green was changed to a light green and goods engines were painted plain black.  1878 saw the goods locomotives also appearing in light green.  This livery was discontinued from 1883 when all locomotives were painted black.  Lining was red and white for passenger locomotives and, if present, red only for goods locomotives.

Passenger coaching stock was originally painted teak, changing in 1875 to an overall light brown.  In 1879 a decision was made to use 'a little brighter shade'.  Finally in June 1881 it was announced that the lower panels were to be painted 'lake colour'.  Between 1896 and 1914 the upper panels became buff with the lower in purple-brown, ends were dark brown.  Roofs were normally dark grey but some did appear in red oxide.

Wagons were unpainted until 1902 except for the ironwork which was black. After 1902 it was painted dark grey.  The graphical symbol of an inverted solid triangle within a circle was replaced in 1902–03 with the letters LY. Brake vans were black and special traffic wagons were painted in various colours, such as red for gunpowder, white for fish, and pale blue for butter.

The football team of the L&YR Carriage and Wagon works at Newton Heath, Manchester, evolved into Manchester United F.C.

Accidents
The Helmshore rail accident on 4 September 1860 saw 11 people killed and 77 injured when the rear portion of a Lancashire & Yorkshire Railway passenger excursion train became detached and ran back down the line where it collided with an oncoming passenger excursion train.

The Burscough Junction crash occurred on 15 January 1880 at the  station on the Liverpool to  line, resulting in nine fatalities.

A passenger train ran into a goods train near Mosesgate on 27 October 1880. Several passengers were injured and about a dozen carriages and a number of wagons were damaged.

One person was killed and seven were injured.

A passenger train was derailed on 15 July 1903 at Waterloo station, then in Lancashire (now Merseyside) caused by a broken spring and spring bridle on the locomotive, while negotiating a  curve at speed. Seven people were killed and 116 were injured.

A third train collided with the wreckage at low speed. One person was killed.

The driver of the LNWR train had overrun signals, but fatigue was a contributory factor.

The Hall Road rail accident at Blundellsands in what is now Merseyside on 27 July 1905 saw 20 killed and 48 injured when two Lancashire & Yorkshire Railway electric passenger trains collided due to human error on the part of a signalman and a train driver.

Two locomotives were shunted into a siding at Hindley & Blackrod Junction, Lancashire on 22 January 1909, but one of them remained foul of the main line. A passenger train collided with it, killing one person and injuring 33.

A passenger train was derailed on the Charlestown Curve when the track spread under it on 21 June 1912. Four people were killed and twelve were injured.

A freight train became divided on 28 October 1913.

Four people were killed and 33 were injured.

A viaduct at Penistone, Yorkshire collapsed on 2 February 1916 due to subsidence. A locomotive was on the bridge at the time, but its crew had time to escape before it fell.

A freight train became divided at Pendlebury, Lancashire. The rear portion was too heavy for the banking locomotive to hold, and it was pushed back downhill and derailed by catch points, as were the wagons.

The Lostock Junction train collision near Bolton on 17 July 1920 saw four fatalities and 148 injured as the result of a near head-on collision between two Lancashire & Yorkshire Railway passenger trains due to a signal having been passed at danger

Post-grouping history
On 25 March 1921, the L&YR and LNWR agreed terms under which the two railways would amalgamate. Before this could occur, the Railways Act 1921 became law on 19 August 1921, under which the L&YR and LNWR would be forced to amalgamate on 1 January 1923 with each other and with other railways, such as the Midland Railway and the Caledonian Railway. The Act included provisions for two or more railways to amalgamate voluntarily before 1923; and the L&YR and LNWR took the opportunity to implement their March 1921 agreement, and on 1 January 1922 both railways were dissolved and a new company was formed, which was also named the London and North Western Railway; its board of twenty directors included six from the former L&YR. The 1923 Grouping duly occurred one years later, which involved the expanded LNWR forming part of the new London Midland and Scottish Railway (LMS).  The general manager, secretary and chief mechanical engineer positions of the expanded company were taken by L&YR employees.  Ex-L&YR lines formed the core of the LMS's Central Division.

The LMS did little to develop the former L&YR routes, which in many places ran parallel to ex-LNWR or ex-Midland routes now forming part of the same network. Nationalisation followed in 1948 followed by a period of rationalisation and modernisation. The L&YR system has survived largely intact, although the following routes have been closed, many within the L&YR's old East Lancashire division:

Bury to Manchester (converted to Manchester Metrolink operation in 1992)
Bury to Clifton Junction, closed 1966
Bury/Radcliffe to Bolton, closed 1970
Bury to Rochdale, closed to regular passenger traffic 1970, but now partly preserved as the East Lancashire Railway heritage railway line
Bury to Accrington/Bacup, closed to regular passenger traffic in 1966, but now partly preserved as the East Lancashire Railway heritage railway line
Bury to Holcombe Brook, fully closed 1963
Rochdale to Bacup, fully closed 1967
Rochdale to Manchester via Oldham – The Oldham Loop, now converted to Manchester Metrolink operation
Blackburn to Burnley via Padiham – The North Lancs or Great Harwood Loop, closed 1964
Blackburn to Chorley, closed 1960
Preston to Southport, closed 1964
Preston to Longridge, closed 1930
Southport to Altcar, closed 1952

The routes today
Most ex-L&YR routes are now operated by Northern. Manchester Victoria station has been rebuilt in a more modest form and retains the former terminal building. The Caldervale Line, as named by West Yorkshire Metro, is also operated by Northern and uses a large part of the former L&YR.

Locomotives

The Lancashire and Yorkshire Railway locomotive works were originally at Miles Platting, Manchester. From 1889 they were at Horwich.

Surviving stock

Surviving coaching stock of L&YR origin go as far as 1878, with Directors Saloon No. 1 being privately preserved at the Keighley & Worth Valley Railway. Multiple coaches are preserved by Lancashire and Yorkshire Railway Trust, at the Keighley & Worth Valley Railway, 6-wheel 5-comp third No. 1507, Blackpool Club Car No. 47, 6-wheel 4-comp First No. 279 and Brake third No. 1474.

Many L&YR carriages, that were sold to the Barry Railway Company also survive, one being a birdcage brake from 1882. 
A dynamometer car also survives at the Midland Rail Centre in Butterley.

Mostly covered goods vans survive in the form of L&YR goods stock, some of these vans also passed into Cadbury ownership for use at Bournville. A brake van also survives at the Kent & East Sussex Railway and the body of a CCT van at the Cambrian Heritage Railways in Oswestry.

Shipping

The L&YR had the largest ship fleet of all the pre-grouping railway companies.  In 1902 the assets of the Drogheda Steam Packet Company were acquired for the sum of £80,000. In 1905 they took over the Goole Steam Shipping Company.

By 1913 they owned 26 vessels, with another two under construction, plus a further five under joint ownership with the London and North Western Railway.  The L&YR ran steamers between Liverpool and Drogheda, Hull and Zeebrugge, and between Goole and many continental ports including Amsterdam, Copenhagen, Hamburg, and Rotterdam.  The jointly-owned vessels provided services between Fleetwood, Belfast and Derry.

See also
 John Hargreaves Jnr
 Locomotives of the Lancashire and Yorkshire Railway

Notes

Bibliography

 
 
 Blakemore, Michael (1984) The Lancashire and Yorkshire Railway, Ian Allan, 
 Coates, Noel (1997) 150 Years of the Lancashire & Yorkshire Railway, Hawkshill Publishing, 
 Earnshaw, Alan (1992) The Lancashire & Yorkshire Railway: Then & Now, Ian Allan, 
 Haigh, A (1978) Railways in West Yorkshire, Dalesman Books, 
 
 
  
  

 
 Nock, O.S. (1969) The Lancashire and Yorkshire Railway – A Concise History, Ian Allan,

Further reading

External links

 Lancashire and Yorkshire Railway Society
 Map of the L&YR
 Lancashire & Yorkshire Railway Trust, restoring locomotives and carriages
 Gallery of photographs

 
Railway companies established in 1847
Railway companies disestablished in 1922
Pre-grouping British railway companies
London, Midland and Scottish Railway constituents
1847 establishments in England
British companies established in 1847
1922 disestablishments in England
British companies disestablished in 1922